Ferryhill Station is situated to the south east of Ferryhill, next to Chilton Lane and near the site of Ferryhill railway station, a few miles south of Durham.

Notable People
 The former Durham cricketer Bob Cole was born in the village.
 A plaque outside 9 Gladstone Terrace denotes where novelist and poet Sid Chaplin lived between 1941 and 1953.

References

External links

Villages in County Durham
Ferryhill